Zamin-e Sabah (also Romanized as Zamīn-e Sabāh) is a village in Ahmadi Rural District, Ahmadi District, Hajjiabad County, Hormozgan Province, Iran. At the 2006 census, its population was 20, in 5 families.

References 

Populated places in Hajjiabad County